The 1994–95 National Football League, known for sponsorship reasons as the Church & General National Football League, was the 64th staging of the National Football League (NFL), an annual Gaelic football tournament for the Gaelic Athletic Association county teams of Ireland.

The tournament introduced two experimental rules: consecutive handpasses were banned, and players had to stay 10 m (11 yd) from the free-kick taker. This later evolved into the current 13 m (14 yd) exclusion zone. Derry defeated Donegal in the final.

Format 
The teams are in four divisions, three of 8 teams and one of 9. Each team plays all the other teams in its division once: either home or away. Teams earn 2 points for a win and 1 for a draw. The top two teams in Divisions 2, 3 and 4 are promoted, while the bottom two teams in Divisions 1, 2 and 3 are relegated.

Eight teams contest the NFL quarter-finals:
The top 4 teams in Division 1
The top 2 teams in Division 2
The first-placed team in Division 3
The first-placed team in Division 4

Results and tables

Division One

Play-Offs

Table

Division two

Play-Offs

Table

Division 3

Division 4

Knockout stage

Quarter-finals

Semi-finals

Final

References

External links

National Football League
National Football League
National Football League (Ireland) seasons